Wicklow Head is a headland near the southeast edge of the town of Wicklow in County Wicklow, approximately  from the centre of the town.

Geographically, it is the easternmost point on the mainland of the Republic of Ireland.

Lighthouses
The original Wicklow Head Lighthouse was one of two lighthouses built on the headland. The original lighthouse actually consisted of two structures to differentiate between Hook Head Lighthouse to the South in Wexford and Baily Lighthouse on Howth Head to the North in Dublin. The rear tower was built as an eight-sided lantern in 1781 powered by 20 tallow candles reflected against a mirror. On 10 October 1836, the tower was struck by lightning, resulting in the destruction of its interior. It was decided however that the tower was to be left as a landmark that could be used during the hours of daylight.

A new lighthouse was built in the 19th century lower down on the headland as it became clear the upper lighthouses were no longer effective for mariners and they were often obscured by fog or mist. On 31 March 1994, the active lighthouse was converted to automatic operation and lighthouse keepers were no longer required to operate it.

See also
 Lambay Island
Extreme points of Ireland - listing points furthest in each direction around Ireland

References

Headlands of County Wicklow
Wicklow (town)